Jeffrey Weitz is a Canadian bioscientist, currently the Canada Research Chair in Thrombosis and Endowed Chair in Cardiovascular Medicine at McMaster University.

References

Year of birth missing (living people)
Living people
Academic staff of McMaster University
Canadian biochemists